Pediculus is a genus of sucking lice, the sole genus in the family Pediculidae. Pediculus species are ectoparasites of primates.

Species include:
Pediculus clavicornis Nitzsch, 1864
Pediculus humanus Linnaeus, 1758
Pediculus humanus humanus Linnaeus, 1758 – the body louse
Pediculus humanus capitis De Geer, 1767 – the head louse
Pediculus mjobergi Ferris, 1916
Pediculus schaeffi Fahrenholz, 1910

Humans are the hosts of Pediculus humanus. Chimpanzees and bonobos host Pediculus shaeffi. Various New World monkeys in the families Cebidae and Atelidae host Pediculus mjobergi.

References

Lice